In enzymology, a 3-hydroxybenzyl-alcohol dehydrogenase is an enzyme that catalyzes the chemical reaction

3-hydroxybenzyl alcohol + NADP+  3-hydroxybenzaldehyde + NADPH + H+

Thus, the two substrates of this enzyme are 3-hydroxybenzyl alcohol and NADP+, whereas its 3 products are 3-hydroxybenzaldehyde, NADPH, and H+.

This enzyme belongs to the family of oxidoreductases, specifically those acting on the CH-OH group of donor with NAD+ or NADP+ as acceptor. The systematic name of this enzyme class is 3-hydroxybenzyl-alcohol:NADP+ oxidoreductase. Other names in common use include m-hydroxybenzyl alcohol dehydrogenase, m-hydroxybenzyl alcohol (NADP+) dehydrogenase, and m-hydroxybenzylalcohol dehydrogenase. This enzyme participates in toluene and xylene degradation.

References

 

EC 1.1.1
NADPH-dependent enzymes
Enzymes of unknown structure